The Joint Service Small Arms Program, abbreviated JSSAP, was created to coordinate weapon standardization between the various United States armed service branches.

First Project - XM9 Procurement 
In 1962, the Air Force adopted the Smith & Wesson Model 15 revolver over the M1911A1.  By 1977 their inventory was wearing out, and the USAF requested special ammunition for the M15 to improve its effectiveness due to malfunctions it suffered.

A Congressional investigation revealed that the USAF had 25 different handguns in inventory. Congressman Addabbo from New York said, "The current proliferation of handguns and handgun ammunition in Air Force inventory is intolerable."  Congress encouraged DOD to select a standard handgun and phase out all others.

This task was assigned to the newly created Joint Service Small Arms Program (JSSAP).

The United States Military forces had been using a variety of different small arms which grew over the years to about ten different types of handguns. Model in use included the M1911A1 (Colt .45 Automatic), Smith & Wesson (Combat Masterpiece in .38 Special caliber), Smith and Wesson Model 1917 (.45 ACP and .45 Auto Rim) and various other small arms.  By the 1970s it became obvious that the M1911A1 (Colt Government .45ACP) model was going to have to be replaced.

The program to purchase the new standardized handgun was designated the XM9 program. There were 85 criteria for handgun characteristics that must be met to satisfy the procurement requirements.

XM9 Requirements
There were 85 requirements for the new handgun.  72 of these were mandatory and 13 were optional.
Basic Requirements:
Chambered in 9mm NATO caliber
Detachable magazine with capacity of at least 13 rounds
Magazine catch which ejects magazine without the use of the second hand
First round trigger pull to be double action, followups single action
Slide stop that locks slide open when the magazine is empty
Durability of 5000 rounds with no more than 8 malfunctions

Safety System:
Thumb-safety system ambidextrous
De-cocking device to safely lower a cocked hammer
Firing pin block when the hammer is lowered

The Air Force invited several makers to compete in this testing program.

The Tests
"A whole series of tests arranged by the Air Force included accuracy, environmental testing, and an endurance trail (sic) in which Mean Rounds Between Stoppages (MRBS) was tallied. Tests included exposure to high levels of dust, mud, extreme heat and cold, as well as human factors testing.

Human factors testing included the ability of shooters to fire accurately.  There were three levels of shooters who fired these guns for accuracy.

First Test USAF Eglin AFB Florida
The XM9 program name had not yet been assigned when these tests took place.
"...The first round of these handgun tests occurred in 1979-1980 at Eglin AFB in Northern Florida.

Of the nine pistol types tested, two were submitted by Heckler & Koch: the P9S and the Heckler & Koch VP70. The former carried the smallest magazine of all the pistols tested, while the VP70 boasted the highest capacity magazine.

The other guns tested included the Beretta 92FS, the Colt SSP, the Fabrique National at Herstal (FN) Hi-power, FN Fast Action and FN double-action (FN DA) models, the Star Model 28 and the Smith & Wesson 459, Walther P88, and Steyr GB. The existing standard M1911A1 and the Smith & Wesson M15 .38 Special handguns were also tested to compare to those which were submitted for comparison.

Results of the First Tests from 1977 
P9S easily won the accuracy phase of testing but fell into disfavor when its operating controls failed to adapt themselves to left-handed use. The magazine capacity (nine rounds) was one short of the desired (later required) capacity.

The Heckler & Koch VP70, with its then unusual trigger mechanism (a three round burst selection was available when the supplied stock was attached), allowed only double action firing and failed the hand-held accuracy portion of the tests. As for the endurance tests, the four P9S specimens fired a total of 18,697 rounds with 360 stoppages, producing an MRBS number of 52 (18,697/360).

The VP70 performed far worse, firing a mere 771 rounds with 137 stoppages for an MRBS of only 5. In fairness to the VP70, the ammunition used for these tests was extremely suspect. None of it approached the "hot" power ratings of the European 9mm ammunition for which Heckler & Koch—and indeed all European manufacturers—had designed their guns.

Star's Model 28, ordinarily a strong, reliable handgun with an excellent service record, also stumbled over the low-powered cartridges, recording the same dismal MRBS number as the VP70.

The  Beretta 92FBS performed the best overall.
Accuracy testing showed that the Air Force had been correct in their selection of the S&W M15 over the M1911A1.  The shooters of the M15 performed better in accuracy than those with the M1911A1 .45 pistol. The new submission of 9mm handguns was the most accurate group.  Very importantly, the 9mm accuracy was even greater over that of the M15 and M1911A1 with the least experienced shooters than it was with experienced shooters.

Six of the submitted firearms passed the test.  The Beretta was announced as the clear winner, having exceeded the stated goals in several cases.  (note: The M92F Beretta was the standard sidearm of the BRD and Israel at this time)

In durability testing the M1911A1 was experiencing 1 failure for every 748 rounds fired.  The Smith & Wesson 459A was performing at 1,952 and the Beretta at 2,000.  This caused controversy since the new M1911A1 pistol had achieved 6000 rounds previously.  The Air Force was testing guns from existing inventory.  Some observers of the test record believe that defective magazines were the reason for the M1911A1's poor performance.

The US Army used the fact that the Air Force did not replace the magazines which caused poor M1911A1 performance was cited as a reason to invalidate all test results. The Army did not like the Air Force's sand, mud, and extreme temperature testing.  The Army conducts their tests of this type with rigorous accuracy recording.  The Army rejected the results of the Air Force Testing.

The JSSAP program managers agree to have the test run again only in the next tests they would be conducted by the Army.

New requirements were created and the new handgun to be procured would now be called the XM9 (prototype, will be type accepted as the M9)

Results of the Second Tests from 1983 
By 1983, a new program was started, now under the XM9 name. These later trials did not have all of the same pistols competing, as some had dropped out, and some were added to the competition.

This time the Army required 30 handguns and spares for each submitted handgun design.  The magazine capacity requirement was changed from 10 to 13. The price was now a fixed price requirement for a procurement of 220,000 pieces.  These changed requirements caused the elimination of some handguns which has participated in the first trial.  Only two of the handguns submitted for the 1977 trial competed in the 1983 trial. They were the  Beretta 92FB and Smith & Wesson 459.

Heckler & Koch submitted a modified version of the Heckler & Koch P7 now with a 10 round Magazine and designated P7A10. The Sig Sauer company submitted a new handgun which had been created for the competition in their SIG Sauer P226.

In February 1982 issued this statement; "The Army, in its role as Defense Department executive agent for 9mm handgun procurement, has cancelled the procurement. It was not possible to make an award because the submitted weapon samples substantially failed to meet the essential requirements contained in the procurement solicitation.  The Department of Defense intends to reexamine its requirements for a new handgun."

This cause a firestorm of protest. Supporters in the military and Congress denounced the Army tests as rigged and a fiasco. The last line in particular was interpreted as allowing the purchase of the M1911A1 models in 9mm or .45 ACP. Colt exacerbated this thought when they subsequently offer an unsolicited proposal to convert existing M1911A1 handguns to 9mm.

The Army's response was that all the contenders had failed in areas of reliable operations in low temperature, sand and mud.  No data to support this was provided.  This denial was justified that since a new competition might be held that data might be competition sensitive.  (Note: Why? Having this data would simply allow the competitors to see where they needed to improve)

An unsupported rumor was that the adverse dirty conditions test required 1000 rounds without failure although 800 would be acceptable.  A claim was made that none of the firearms achieved even 600 rounds.

As a result of this there were threats of lawsuits by the makers who felt defamed and worse a Congressional investigation.

Results of the Third Tests from 1984 
The third trial was run from 1983 to 1984.  The handguns submitted were Beretta 92SBF, the SIG Sauer P226, the Heckler & Koch P7A10, the Smith & Wesson 459, the Steyr GB, the FN Double Action Hi-Power, the Colt SSP and the Walther P88.

The Steyr GB pistol was submitted during these trials.  It performed well in many areas but failed reliability testing.
The Walther P88 failed the Drop test and was found to have cracked frames (2 units) after 7000 rounds.
In both trials where the  Beretta 92FBS  and Sig Sauer P226 competed the Sig was either equal or superior to the Beretta in most tests. During the dry mud test, the S&W, H&K, and Beretta passed with nearly perfect scores but the Sig only received 79 percent. The Walther failed both the wet and dry mud tests.  The purchase price for the Beretta M9 handgun was $178.50 per unit.

Ultimately, two were left standing, the  Beretta 92FBS and the SIG Sauer P226. The P226 lost out in the final bidding and the Beretta emerged as the winner once again, being adopted as the M9 pistol. Controversy over these trials lead to the XM10 trials in 1988. Ruger submitted their new P85. But the trials were boycotted by some makes and resulted in the Beretta winning again.

Early Competitors 
: Beretta of Italy entered their Beretta 92S-1, which would later be made into the 92F design. This emerged as the winner of the trials and would be eventually adopted as the Beretta M9.
: FN Herstal of Belgium submitted three separate designs, the Browning BDA, the FN GP version of the Browning Hi-Power and the FN FA, a special double-action version of the Hi-Power. 
: Colt's Manufacturing Company of the United States submitted the Colt SSP (stainless steel pistol), a 9×19mm Parabellum variant of the Colt Model 1971, which was an earlier attempt to develop a new service pistol to replace the M1911, with some minor mechanical alterations made for the trials. Colt submitted 30 new SSPs out of a production run of around 50, but their pistol was not selected. One example is on display at the Aberdeen Proving Ground.
: Walther of Germany submitted the Walther P88.
: Heckler & Koch, also of Germany, submitted two pistols, the Heckler & Koch P9S and the Heckler & Koch VP70.
: Smith & Wesson of the United States submitted their Smith & Wesson 459.
: Star Bonifcacio Echevveria S.A. of Spain submitted their Star M28. 
: Steyr of Austria submitted the Steyr GB.

XM9 Competitors
The later XM9 trials, done because other manufacturers contested the results, did not have all of the same pistols competing, and added a few others while retaining the ones that satisfactorily completed the previous trials. Eight pistols were competing.

: Beretta of Italy entered their Beretta 92F, which was an improvement of their previous entry, the Beretta 92S-1. This emerged as the winner of these trials as well, and would be eventually adopted as the Beretta M9.
: SIG Sauer (under the name SigArms) introduced their new pistol specifically designed for the trials, the P226. The P226 was the runner-up to the M9, as both were the only two to satisfactorily pass the trials. However, the P226 would ultimately not be chosen. In a later competition for a compact service pistol, SIG Sauer's P228 became the M11 pistol.
: FN Herstal of Belgium gave up on the other two designs and submitted again their FN Double Action Hi-Power, a modified double-action version of the Browning Hi-Power. 
: Colt's Manufacturing Company of the United States submitted the Colt SSP, a stainless steel double action pistol. 
: Walther of Germany submitted the Walther P88.
: Heckler & Koch, also of Germany, gave up on their previous two efforts and entered the P7.
: Smith & Wesson of the United States submitted their Smith & Wesson 459. 
: Steyr of Austria submitted the Steyr GB.

Joint Combat Pistol 
In the 2000s, a new joint service handgun was started, the Joint Combat Pistol which was the result of a merger of two earlier programs: the U.S. Army's Future Handgun System and United States Special Operations Command's SOF Combat Pistol. However, the Army ultimately pulled out of the competition.

As a result of the Modular Handgun System trials, the Sig Sauer P320 was selected as the new service pistol for the United States Armed Forces. The military designations are M17/M18 for the full size and compact models respectively.

See also
List of individual weapons of the U.S. armed forces
Objective Personal Defense Weapon
Personal defense weapon
XM17 Modular Handgun System competition

References

Semi-automatic pistols of the United States
Semi-automatic pistols